The Mitchell–Tappan House is a historic house in Hibbing, Minnesota, United States.  It was built in 1897 as a residence for executives of the Oliver Mining Company.  The house was listed on the National Register of Historic Places in 1980 for its local significance in the themes of architecture and social history.  It was nominated for reflecting the sumptuous lifestyle enjoyed by an elite few in the early mining era.

The Oliver Mining Company continued to use the Mitchell–Tappan House as an executive residence into the 1960s.  In recent years its owners operated it as a bed and breakfast.

See also
 National Register of Historic Places listings in St. Louis County, Minnesota

References

1897 establishments in Minnesota
Bed and breakfasts in Minnesota
Buildings and structures in Hibbing, Minnesota
Houses completed in 1897
Houses in St. Louis County, Minnesota
Houses on the National Register of Historic Places in Minnesota
Mining in Minnesota
National Register of Historic Places in St. Louis County, Minnesota
Queen Anne architecture in Minnesota